Steinauer is a surname. Notable people with the surname include:

 Marco Steinauer (born 1976), Swiss ski jumper
 Mathias Steinauer, (born 1959), Swiss composer
 Orlondo Steinauer (born 1973), American football player
  Steinauer vineyard was near Naumburg

See also
 Steinauer, Nebraska, village in Pawnee County, Nebraska, United States